The 5th Mirchi Music Awards, presented by the Radio Mirchi, honoured the best of Hindi music from the year 2012. The ceremony was held on 7 February 2013 and was hosted by Ayushmann Khurana and Meiyang Chang. Agneepath won a leading seven awards including Album of the Year and Song of the Year for "Abhi Mujh Mein Kahin". The show was broadcast on 3 March 2013 on Colors.

Winners and nominees 

The nominations were decided on 15 January 2013. The winners were selected by the members of jury, chaired by Javed Akhtar. The following are the names of nominees and winners.

(Winners are listed first, highlighted in boldface.)

Film awards

Technical awards

Non-film awards

Special awards

Listeners' Choice awards

Jury awards

Films with multiple wins and nominations

 Won two Listeners' Choice  awards

Jury 
The jury was chaired by Javed Akhtar. Other members were:

 Aadesh Shrivastava - music composer and singer
 Alka Yagnik - playback singer
 Anu Malik - music director
 Ashutosh Gowariker - director, writer and producer
 Ila Arun - actress and folk singer
 Lalit Pandit - composer
 Kailash Kher - singer
 Kavita Krishnamurthy - playback singer
 Louis Banks - composer, record producer and singer
 Prasoon Joshi - lyricist and screenwriter
 Rakeysh Omprakash Mehra - filmmaker and screenwriter
 Ramesh Sippy - director and producer
 Sadhana Sargam - playback singer
 Sameer - lyricist
 Shankar Mahadevan - composer and playback singer
 Sooraj Barjatya - director, producer and screenwriter
 Suresh Wadkar - playback singer
 Talat Aziz - singer

See also 
 Mirchi Music Awards

References

External links 
 Music Mirchi Awards Official Website
 Music Mirchi Awards 2012

Mirchi Music Awards